WHBE-FM (105.7 MHz, "ESPN Louisville") is a radio station broadcasting a sports format. Licensed to Eminence, Kentucky, United States, the station serves the Louisville, Kentucky and Frankfort, Kentucky areas.  The station is owned by UB Louisville, LLC.

History
The station was assigned the call letters WKXF-FM on 1988-05-11.  On 1991-06-14, the station changed its call sign to WXLN, on 1991-07-02 to WXLN-FM, on 1996-06-14 to WXLM, on 2000-04-27 to WYKY, on 2001-12-27 to WTSZ, on 2002-01-04 to WTSZ-FM, on 2006-05-19 to WTUV-FM and on 2014-05-02 to the current WHBE-FM. The change to WHBE-FM came after the station was sold by Davidson Media Group to UB Louisville, who already owned WHBE (680 AM).

Previous logo

References

External links

HBE-FM
HBE-FM
ESPN Radio stations
Radio stations established in 1988
1988 establishments in Kentucky
Henry County, Kentucky